Marin Šego (born 2 August 1985) is a Croatian professional handball player who plays as a goalkeeper for Frisch Auf Göppingen and the Croatian national team.

He participated at the 2019 World Championship and the 2020 European Championship with Croatia.

Honours
Izviđač Ljubuški
Bosnia and Herzegovina Premier League: 2003–04

Croatia Osiguranje Zagreb
Croatian Premier League: 2008–09, 2009–10, 2010–11, 2011–12
Croatian Cup: 2009, 2010, 2011, 2012

Vive Tauron Kielce
Polish League: 2015, 2016
Polish Cup: 2015, 2016
EHF Champions League: 2015–16

Pick Szeged
Nemzeti Bajnokság I: 2017–18
Hungarian  Cup: 2019

References

External links

1985 births
Living people
Croatian male handball players
RK Zagreb players
Sportspeople from Mostar
Croats of Bosnia and Herzegovina
Expatriate handball players
Croatian expatriate sportspeople in Germany
Croatian expatriate sportspeople in France
Croatian expatriate sportspeople in Hungary
Croatian expatriate sportspeople in Poland
Wisła Płock (handball) players
Vive Kielce players
SC Pick Szeged players
Montpellier Handball players
Frisch Auf Göppingen players
Handball-Bundesliga players